Semu River is a river of northern Tanzania, tributary of Sibiti River, among lake Eyasi and lake Kitangiri.

References

Rivers of Tanzania